Araucanía or Araucana  was the Spanish name given to the region of Chile inhabited by the Mapuche peoples known as the Moluche (also known as Araucanos by the Spanish) in the 18th century. Prior to the Spanish conquest of Chile, the lands of the Moluche lay between the Itata River and Toltén River.

History
Following the great rising of the Moluche and Huilliche after the Battle of Curalaba in 1598 during the Arauco War, they expelled the Spanish from south of the Bío-Bío River. After many decades of further warfare, the bounds of Araucania were recognized by the Spanish as being between the Bío-Bío and Toltén rivers. This old region of Araucanía now is divided between the southern part of the Bío-Bío Region and the Araucanía Region in southern Chile.

See also 
 La Araucana 
 Kingdom of Araucania and Patagonia
 Futahuillimapu
 La Frontera region of Chile
 Wallmapu

References

Inline citations

General refelences
  Juan Ignatius Molina, The Geographical, Natural, and Civil History of Chili, Vol II., Longman, Hurst, Rees, and Orme, London, 1809

Historical regions
Geography of Chile
Mapuche history